Alan Kane is a former Democratic Unionist Party (DUP) politician, barrister and King's Counsel from Northern Ireland.

Kane made his political debut in 1981, topping the council poll in Cookstown Town and was elected to the Northern Ireland Assembly the following year for Mid Ulster.

Kane was opposed to any form of compromise with Irish Nationalist parties, attacking the Social Democratic and Labour Party (SDLP) as "republicans and subversives"  and stating that Catholics "support the IRA to a large extent."

In 1985, he became involved in the controversy over re-routing of Orange Order marches through Nationalist areas in Cookstown, stating that one of the most senior Royal Ulster Constabulary (RUC) officers, Leo Dolan, "as a Roman Catholic and former neighbour of Owen Carron's family is no friend of the Protestant people."

Kane quit the DUP in 1992 in protest at the party's decision to become involved in a talks process which also involved the Irish Government, and stepped down from Cookstown council the following year.

References

Year of birth missing (living people)
Living people
Members of Cookstown District Council
Northern Ireland MPAs 1982–1986
Democratic Unionist Party politicians
Northern Ireland King's Counsel